Rudolph Kemmler, born Rudolph Kemler, (January 1860 – June 20, 1909) was an American Major League Baseball catcher for all or part of eight seasons.

Kemmler was a poor hitter but a good defensive catcher. In the days before catchers had protection against pitched balls, he was quite durable. He spent most of his career as a reserve player.

Kemmler caught two no-hitters in 1884 for Columbus Buckeye pitchers Ed Morris and Frank Mountain.

Kemmler died in his hometown of Chicago, and is interred at Concordia Cemetery in Forest Park, Illinois.

References

Sources

1860 births
1909 deaths
Major League Baseball catchers
19th-century baseball players
Providence Grays players
Cleveland Blues (NL) players
Cincinnati Red Stockings (AA) players
Pittsburgh Alleghenys players
Columbus Buckeyes players
St. Louis Browns (AA) players
Columbus Solons players
Davenport Brown Stockings players
Duluth Freezers players
St. Paul Saints (Northwestern League) players
Davenport Onion Weeders players
Minneapolis Millers (baseball) players
St. Paul Apostles players
Baseball players from Chicago
Burials in Forest Park, Illinois